Elmore County is a county located in the east central portion of the U.S. state of Alabama. As of the 2020 census, the population was 87,977. Its county seat is Wetumpka. Its name is in honor of General John A. Elmore.

Elmore County is part of the Montgomery, AL Metropolitan Statistical Area.

History
Elmore County was established on February 15, 1866, from portions of Autauga, Coosa, Tallapoosa, and Montgomery counties.

The French established Fort Toulouse at the confluence of the Coosa and Tallapoosa in 1717.

Gen. Andrew Jackson then erected Fort Jackson in 1814 at the site of Fort Toulouse following the Battle of Horseshoe Bend.

On July 2, 1901, a local mob lynched Robert (or perhaps Robin) White. In a strange turn of events, a local farmer, George Howard confessed in court to the killing and named five other local men as killers. Three men were convicted in the killing and sentenced to ten years in prison. On 9 June 1902, they were pardoned by Governor Jelks. In 1915 another Black man was taken from the local jail and murdered.

In 1950, a City Planning Board was formed in the county seat of Wetumpka.

In 1957, the National Guard Armory was constructed in the county seat of Wetumpka.

Geography

The county is located on the fall line of the eastern United States, and consequently boasts a diverse geography. Most of the county contains rolling hills, being located in the Piedmont region. Some parts of the county do have open fields and farmland as well. The cities of Wetumpka and Tallassee are important river cities located on the fall line.

Major highways
 Interstate 65
 U.S. Highway 82
 U.S. Highway 231
 State Route 9
 State Route 14
 State Route 50
 State Route 63
 State Route 111
 State Route 143
 State Route 170
 State Route 212
 State Route 229

Adjacent counties
Coosa County (north)
Tallapoosa County (northeast)
Macon County (southeast)
Montgomery County (south)
Autauga County (west)
Chilton County (northwest)

Demographics

2000 census
At the 2000 census there were 65,874 people, 22,737 households, and 17,552 families living in the county. The population density was 106 people per square mile (41/km2). There were 25,733 housing units at an average density of 41 per square mile (16/km2).  The racial makeup of the county was 77.02% White, 20.64% Black or African American, 0.43% Native American, 0.36% Asian, 0.03% Pacific Islander, 0.48% from other races, and 1.04% from two or more races. 1.22% of the population were Hispanic or Latino of any race.
Of the 22,737 households 37.40% had children under the age of 18 living with them, 61.40% were married couples living together, 12.00% had a female householder with no husband present, and 22.80% were non-families. 20.00% of households were one person and 7.70% were one person aged 65 or older. The average household size was 2.66 and the average family size was 3.07.

The age distribution was 25.70% under the age of 18, 8.80% from 18 to 24, 32.10% from 25 to 44, 22.70% from 45 to 64, and 10.70% 65 or older. The median age was 35 years. For every 100 females, there were 102.50 males. For every 100 females age 18 and over, there were 101.30 males.

The median household income was $41,243 and the median family income  was $47,155. Males had a median income of $32,643 versus $24,062 for females. The per capita income for the county was $17,650. About 7.40% of families and 10.20% of the population were below the poverty line, including 14.20% of those under age 18 and 11.30% of those age 65 or over. In the late 1990s, voters voted to pass a mandatory fire fee for volunteer fire services. All citizens pay this same fee regardless of valuation of the property or income levels.

2010 census
At the 2010 census there were 79,303 people, 28,301 households, and 21,003 families living in the county. The population density was 128 people per square mile (49/km2). The racial makeup of the county was 76.2% White, 20.0% Black or African American, 0.4% Native American, 0.7% Asian, 0.1% Pacific Islander, 1.2% from other races, and 1.4% from two or more races. 2.7% of the population were Hispanic or Latino of any race.
Of the 28,301 households 32.5% had children under the age of 18 living with them, 56.6% were married couples living together, 13.1% had a female householder with no husband present, and 25.8% were non-families. 22.0% of households were one person and 7.8% were one person aged 65 or older. The average household size was 2.61 and the average family size was 3.04.

The age distribution was 23.6% under the age of 18, 9.3% from 18 to 24, 27.9% from 25 to 44, 27.4% from 45 to 64, and 11.9% 65 or older. The median age was 37.8 years. For every 100 females, there were 95.3 males. For every 100 females age 18 and over, there were 94.7 males.

The median household income was $53,128 and the median family income  was $62,870. Males had a median income of $46,952 versus $31,542 for females. The per capita income for the county was $22,640. About 9.1% of families and 12.4% of the population were below the poverty line, including 16.8% of those under age 18 and 9.4% of those age 65 or over.

2020 census

As of the 2020 United States census, there were 87,977 people, 30,712 households, and 21,146 families residing in the county.

Government and infrastructure
The Julia Tutwiler Prison for Women of the Alabama Department of Corrections is in Wetumpka in Elmore County. The prison houses Alabama's female death row. Wetumpka was previously the site of the Wetumpka State Penitentiary.

Politically, Elmore County is heavily Republican. It last voted Democratic for Jimmy Carter in 1976, which incidentally was also the last time a Democrat carried Alabama at the presidential level.

Economy
Over the past two decades, Elmore County has transferred from an economy based on agriculture to one of Alabama's fastest-growing counties. According to a recent report, 1110 jobs were created over the last 4 years.

Elmore County's largest employer is the manufacturing sector. The top ten manufacturers in Elmore County include: GKN Aerospace, Neptune Technologies, Frontier Yarns, Russell Corporation, Madix, Inc, Arrowhead Composites, Hanil USA, YESAC Alabama Corporation, Quality Networks, Inc., and AES Industries.

Education
The Elmore County Public School System serves most of the county. A portion is in the Tallassee City School District.

Communities

Cities
Prattville (partly in Autauga County)
Millbrook (partly in Autauga County)
Tallassee (partly in Tallapoosa County)
Wetumpka (county seat)

Towns
Coosada
Deatsville
Eclectic
Elmore

Census-designated places
Blue Ridge
Emerald Mountain
Holtville
Redland

Unincorporated communities
Burlington
Kent
Seman
Titus
Central

See also

National Register of Historic Places listings in Elmore County, Alabama
Properties on the Alabama Register of Landmarks and Heritage in Elmore County, Alabama

References

External links
Official site
Elmore County Tourism site
Elmore County Corporate Development Information (ECEDA)
River Region Tourism site

 

 
Montgomery metropolitan area
1866 establishments in Alabama
Counties of Appalachia
Populated places established in 1866